Super Hornio Brothers and Super Hornio Brothers II are two 1993 pornographic parodies of the Super Mario video game series released at the same time as the series' official film, Super Mario Bros. Both films star director Buck Adams, along with T. T. Boy, Ron Jeremy and Chelsea Lynx together as the main characters. The films gained new interest after a write-up by a Something Awful reviewer. Nintendo bought the rights to the films to halt their distribution.

Plot

Super Hornio Brothers
Programmer Squeegie Hornio (Ron Jeremy), based on Mario, and his brother Ornio Hornio (T.T. Boy), based on Luigi, are teleported into Squeegie's in-development PC game after a freak power overload. After regaining their bearings, Squeegie figures out and explains to Ornio that they are stuck in the black void of a computer monitor when it's turned off. A computer virus informs the brothers that King Pooper (Buck Adams), based on Bowser (also known as King Koopa), has kidnapped Princess Perlina (Chelsea Lynx), based on Princess Peach. King Pooper intends on forcefully having Perlina help him travel to Earth with a tub full of semen energized by a special generator.

Squeegie and Ornio travel through the computer world, encountering other villains who attempt to delay them and hamper their efforts. Squeegie is temporarily separated from his brother in the process. Finding King Pooper's lair first, Squeegie attempts to free Princess Perlina, only to be found by King Pooper. Attempting to fight King Pooper alone, Squeegie is about to lose when Ornio reappears and shoves King Pooper into the tub, where he melts and dies. The brothers ask Princess Perlina to teleport them back to Earth, but Perlina only transports herself and Ornio back, leaving Squeegie behind in the cyberworld. Attempting to manipulate the generator to get back to the real world, Squeegie is confronted and appears to be captured by a revived King Pooper.

Super Hornio Brothers II
After a lengthy recap of the first installment, Princess Perlina and Ornio teleport back to Squeegie's office. Wondering where Squeegie is, Ornio is distracted by Princess Perlina offering sex as a reward for saving her from King Pooper. After sexual intercourse, Ornio asks Perlina to bring Squeegie back to the real world. The teleportation goes horribly wrong; Perlina teleports both Squeegie and King Pooper just as King Pooper confronts Squeegie at the generator seen at the end of Super Hornio Brothers. King Pooper escapes, and he begins to enact his ultimate goal, bluntly explained by Perlina to the Hornio Brothers as to "procreate and create more King Pooper offspring." While King Pooper hires a prostitute to start his plan, Squeegie theorizes that the generator is the key to King Pooper's scheme and draws up plans to destroy it.

Mimicking what they did the first time around, Squeegie and Ornio teleport back into the computer. Guided by the computer virus, Ornio distracts a hooker, which allows Squeegie and the computer virus to go back to King Pooper's lair. Squeegie comes up with a plan to thwart King Pooper by having the computer virus "overload" the generator and knock it out. The computer virus rubs his body against the machine, causing it to overload. Squeegie explains to Ornio and Princess Perlina back in the real world that by overloading the generator, King Pooper is now in "a state of limbo" and won't cause any more trouble. Ecstatic, Princess Perlina embraces and hugs Ornio while ignoring Squeegie. A spurned Squeegie turns to the camera and says that he expected the film to end this way.

Cast

Super Hornio Brothers
 Buck Adams as King Pooper
 T. T. Boy as Ornio Hornio
 Courtney as Bon Dori, Queen of Bondage
 Don Fernando as Bob
 Ron Jeremy as Squeegie Hornio
 Krysti Lynn as Spider Woman
 Chelsea Lynx as Princess Perlina
 Kitty Yung as Ileeza, Mistress of Evil

Super Hornio Brothers II
 Buck Adams as King Pooper
 T.T. Boy as Ornio Hornio
 Don Fernando as Bob
 Ron Jeremy as Squeegie Hornio
 Krysti Lynn as Spider Woman
 Chelsea Lynx as Princess Perlina

Production
Initially, porn studio Sin City Entertainment funded the project, but they dropped out, leaving Buck Adams to seek the help of Midnight Video to finish the film. In return for funding, Adams was asked by Midnight Video to trim the 37-page script, split the film into two and cut the filming schedule from three days to two. Jeremy notes that the total production cost reportedly around $20,000, and that Buck Adams "....tried very hard to simulate the basic show. Buck knew Mario Brothers inside and out."

Initially thought of as a rumor, Ron Jeremy's official site notes that while they would love to make both films available alongside the massive library they have, Nintendo bought up the rights to both films to halt distribution indefinitely. Jeremy notes in an interview that such buying of porn parodies to halt distribution are "unheard of" in the porn industry and that he only found out about it when a company called Hot Movies tried to buy his back catalog for distribution and found out about the purchase.

Something Awful
In July, 2008, Zack Parsons of Something Awful was tipped off by a forum post claiming that there was a pornographic parody of Super Mario Bros. Initially dismissed as fake, upon being confirmed as real, the site attempted to buy the film through retailers with no luck. The next month, Parsons issued a challenge for the site's "Horrors of Pornography" section to obtain a copy. After numerous false leads, ranging from SA users giving a sex only CD-ROM with none of the dialogue scenes to people remembering they once had it but ultimately having another porno they mistook, an anonymous benefactor gave Awful a DVD-rip of II in June 2009. The sequel contained a recap of I, which was sufficient enough for the site's reviewer of it to play catch-up.

The Something Awful article is often the basis of other sites "finding out" about and making articles about the porn parody. In addition, the films are claimed to have both existed and not existed by many people.

In 2014, a Something Awful forum user claimed to have purchased a copy of Super Hornio Brothers. However, this was a mislabeled tape of Super Hornio Brothers II in the packaging of the first film.

References

External links
 
 
 
 
 
 

1990s pornographic films
American parody films
Unofficial works based on Mario
Pornographic parody films
1990s English-language films
1990s American films